Newtonville is an unincorporated community in Fayette County, Alabama, United States.

History
The community is named after E. B. Newton, an early settler of the area. A post office operated under the name Newtonville from 1850 to 1940.

References

Unincorporated communities in Fayette County, Alabama
Unincorporated communities in Alabama